Mitchell Schwarzer is a historian who writes on architecture and the built environment. He is Professor of Architectural and Urban History in the Department of the History of Art and Visual Culture at California College of the Arts.  His wife Marjorie is a professor of museum studies.

Biography
Mitchell was born in 1957 to Sigmund and Genia Schwarzer, Polish Holocaust survivors, at the Norton Air Force Base hospital in San Bernardino, California. His family then moved to an apartment in Queens, New York, and eventually a ranch house in Manhasset Hills on Long Island.  He attended Denton Avenue Elementary School, Shelter Rock Junior High School, and graduated from Herricks High School in 1975.  Subsequently, he received his BA from Washington University in 1979 (including a junior year abroad program in Florence, Italy), and his Masters in City Planning from Harvard University in 1981.

Upon graduation, Schwarzer worked for an environmental consulting firm in the San Francisco Bay Area and later the San Francisco Department of City Planning where he was one of the authors of the Downtown Plan (1985).  In 1986, he began doctoral study in the History, Theory and Criticism of Architecture at the Massachusetts Institute of Technology, and received his Ph.D. in 1991.  While researching his dissertation on Adolf Loos he lived for a year as a Fulbright scholar in Vienna, Austria.

Schwarzer's first academic position was at the University of Illinois at Chicago, where he taught at the art history department from 1991 to 1995.  He began full-time teaching at California College of the Arts in 1996, and co-founded the school's Masters Program in Visual Criticism (now called Visual and Critical Studies).  He has taught lecture classes on the history of architecture and art as well as seminars on architectural, urban, and landscape theory, aesthetics, cultural criticism, the avant garde, visual perception, and film and literature of the city.  He has lectured widely in the United States and given talks in Austria, Canada, China, the Czech Republic, Denmark, Germany, Great Britain, the Netherlands and Vietnam.

Books
Hella Town: Oakland's History of Development and Disruption"", University of California Press (2021) Architecture of the San Francisco Bay Area: History and Guide, William Stout (2006) Zoomscape: Architecture in Motion and Media, Princeton Architectural Press (2004)  Architecture and Design: SF, Understanding Business (1998) German Architectural Theory and the Search for Modern Identity'', Cambridge University Press (1995)

External links

Schwarzer's faculty page at the California College of the Arts.
 https://placesjournal.org/author/mitchell-schwarzer/?cn-reloaded=1
 https://www.linkedin.com/in/mitchell-schwarzer-42b83019/

American architectural historians
American male non-fiction writers
Living people
Harvard Graduate School of Design alumni
1957 births
California College of the Arts faculty
People from San Bernardino, California
People from Queens, New York
Washington University in St. Louis alumni
MIT School of Architecture and Planning alumni
University of Illinois Chicago faculty
People from Manhasset, New York
Historians from New York (state)
Historians from California
Herricks High School alumni